Ptychochromoides is a genus of cichlids endemic to Madagascar. Of the three described species, two are critically endangered and one was considered extinct until rediscovered in late 2010.

Species
The genus formerly included Katria katria, which was moved to its own genus in 2006. There are currently three recognized species in Ptychochromoides:

 Ptychochromoides betsileanus (Boulenger, 1899) (Trondo mainty)
 Ptychochromoides itasy Sparks, 2004
 Ptychochromoides vondrozo Sparks & Reinthal, 2001

References

 
 
Freshwater fish genera
Cichlid genera
Taxonomy articles created by Polbot
Endemic fauna of Madagascar